Xamontarupt is a commune in the Vosges department in Grand Est in northeastern France.
Its inhabitants are known as Rupéains or Xamontois.

Geography
Abutting the heavily wooded massif of le Fossard, the village is crossed by the Cuves stream, an outflow of the Vologne river.

History
Evidence of protohistoric human presence: construction from set stones, flakes of cut quartz.
400-year old holly in the village, probably some of the oldest in Europe, can be seen on the route leading to the Haut-du-Bois maquis.

In 1656, the village was called "Charmontaruz"

Population

Personalities
 Jean-René Claudel, amateur speleologist and archeologist, discovered the flakes of quartzite.

See also
Communes of the Vosges department

References

External links

 Intercommunal site

Communes of Vosges (department)
Vosges communes articles needing translation from French Wikipedia